Christopher Anthony Cayole (born January 1, 1985) is an American former professional basketball player who last played for Santos de San Luis in Mexico. He has consistently been one of the most proficient 3 point marksmen in the NBL Canada and other leagues. Cayole's off court experience included serving as a Basketball Camp Counselor for eight years at the University of Vermont and his alma mater Saint Michael's College.

College statistics

|-
| style="text-align:left;"| 2005–06
| style="text-align:left;"| Saint Michael's
| 27 || 8 || 20.48 || .390 || .300 || .746|| 4.0 ||1.3  || 0.8 || 1.0 || 8.7
|-
| style="text-align:left;"| 2006–07
| style="text-align:left;"| Saint Michael's
| 29 || 29 || 32.14 || .485 || .392 || .776|| 6.0 ||2.1  || 0.9 || 1.4 || 13.8
|-

Career statistics

Regular season 

|-
| align="left" | 2011–12
| align="left" | Island Storm
| 16 || 12 || 26.4 ||.463  || .455 || .706 || 3.06 ||1.38  ||0.50 ||0.75 || 12.00
|-
| align="left" | 2012–13
| align="left" | Island Storm
| 43 || 10 || 22.1 ||.425  || .405 || .722 || 2.14 ||1.05  ||0.79 ||0.40 || 9.56
|-
| align="left" | 2014–15
| align="left" | Halifax Rainmen
|42 ||27|| 25.3||  .430|| .282|| .786|| 3.00|| 1.00|| 1.00|| 0.26|| 11.31
|-
| align="left" | 2014–15
| align="left" | Brampton A's
|1 ||0|| 8.2||  .500|| 1.000|| .000|| 1.00|| 0.00|| 0.00|| 0.00|| 3.00
|-
| align="left" | 2015–16
| align="left" | Santos de San Luis
|38 ||38|| 37.3||  .447|| .359|| .796|| 5.47|| 1.55|| 1.66|| 0.29|| 23.79
|-
| align="left" | 2015–16
| align="left" | Ciclista Olímpico
|25 ||23|| 24.0||  .398|| .352|| .719|| 2.92||0.28 || 0.36|| 0.08|| 9.36
|-
| align="left" | 2016–17
| align="left" | La Union Formosa
|6 ||1|| 14.2||  .500|| .500|| .750|| 1.17||0.83 ||0.00 || 0.00|| 4.67
|-
| align="left" | 2016–17
| align="left" | Brujos de Guayama
|2 ||2|| 21.9||  .375|| .000|| .750|| 4.50|| 0.00||0.00 || 0.00|| 7.50
|-
| align="left" | 2017–18
| align="left" | Akita Happinets
|36 ||1|| 17.9||  .374|| .315|| .759|| 3.4|| 1.1|| 1.0|| 0.2|| 10.00
|-
| align="left" | 2018–19
| align="left" | Santos de San Luis
|17 ||15|| 31.7||  .422|| .449|| .811|| 3.12|| 1.59|| 0.65|| 0.18|| 14.59
|-
|}

Playoffs 

|-
|style="text-align:left;"|2012–13
|style="text-align:left;"|Island S
| 9 ||  || 21.3 || .449 || .500 || .792 || 1.8 || 0.6 || 0.8 || 0.8 || 8.4
|-
|style="text-align:left;"|2014–15
|style="text-align:left;"|Halifax
| 9 ||  || 22.3 || .486 || .200 || .813 || 2.4 || 0.6 || 0.7 || 0.4 || 9.7
|-
|style="text-align:left;"|2014–15
|style="text-align:left;"|Olimpico
| 9 ||  || 24.1 || .339 || .280 || .636 || 2.4 || 0.7 || 0.2 || 0.1 || 6.6
|-
|style="text-align:left;"|2017–18
|style="text-align:left;"|Akita
| 5 || 1 || 15.17 || .424 || .250 || .385 || 3.8 || 0.4 || 0.4 || 0.4 || 7.2
|-

Personal
Cayole got married on September 8, 2017. He tied the knot to Heather Abair. He is a son of Philip and Donna Bibby-Cayole and has two older brothers. Brother, Mike, played junior college basketball at Champlain College.

External links
Full bio
Chris Cayole  on Youtube
Mexican Dunk Contest Champion
RealGm Stats
Stats in Japan

References

1985 births
Living people
Akita Northern Happinets players
American expatriate basketball people in Argentina
American expatriate basketball people in Canada
American expatriate basketball people in Germany
American expatriate basketball people in Japan
American expatriate basketball people in Mexico
Basketball players from Vermont
Brampton A's players
Ciclista Olímpico players
Halifax Rainmen players
Island Storm players
La Unión basketball players
Saint Michael's Purple Knights men's basketball players
Santos de San Luis players
American men's basketball players
Small forwards